Noelle is a 2019 American Christmas fantasy comedy film written and directed by Marc Lawrence, produced by Walt Disney Pictures and distributed by Walt Disney Studios Motion Pictures. The film stars Anna Kendrick as Noelle Kringle, the daughter of Kris Kringle. It also stars Bill Hader, Kingsley Ben-Adir, Billy Eichner, Julie Hagerty, and Shirley MacLaine. In the film, when Noelle's brother Nick is stressed from all the pressure of taking over for their father, he leaves and does not return. She must find her brother and bring him back in time for Christmas. It was filmed from October 2017 to January 2018 in British Columbia and Woodstock, Georgia. Noelle was released on November 12, 2019, on Disney+, receiving mixed reviews from critics.

Plot
At the North Pole, preparations for the upcoming Christmas are quickly taking place. After the current Santa Claus's death five months prior, his son, Nick Kringle, is having difficulties trying to complete his training in order to become the next Santa. His younger sister, Noelle, who has been placed in charge of distributing and maintaining Christmas spirit, continues to support him, and even suggests taking the weekend off as to avoid the stress and relax before the big day. Complying, Nick takes off overnight with the reindeer, and does not return following the weekend.

When the reindeer return without Nick and Noelle admits to giving him controversial advice, the elves get angry at her. The elf elders forcibly appoint her cousin Gabriel, the Kringles' tech support, to fill in as the new Santa. Guilt-stricken and forlorn, Noelle deduces that Nick fled to Phoenix, Arizona, and takes off with the Sleigh and reindeer with her childhood nanny Polly.

They set down in a mall. With the permission of manager Helen Rojas and the customers' support and belief that it was a Christmas exhibit, Noelle sets out into the city to find Nick, leaving Polly to tend to the sleigh and reindeer. She meets and hires Jake Hapman, a private investigator as well as a recently divorced dad, to track down Nick. Noelle also interacts with Jake's enthusiastic son Alex and several other people, discovering that she can understand and communicate in other languages (including American Sign Language), as well as tell the naughty from the nice.

Jake tracks Nick down to a yoga studio, where Nick is enthusiastic to see Noelle yet refuses to return north and become Santa. After a heated argument, Noelle leaves the building. She returns to the mall, where her reindeer friend Snowcone arrives with a letter from Mrs. Claus informing her about the situation back home and ordering her to find and bring Nick back home. During Noelle's time away, Gabriel had used an algorithm to determine that there were only 2,837 "nice" children in the world, much to the horror of the elves and Mrs. Claus.

With help from Snowcone, Noelle tracks down Nick to a yoga retreat at the Desert Botanical Garden, and convinces him to return. Meeting up with her and Polly at the mall the next day, Noelle has him continue to train by being a mall Santa. While Nick sees the text message being sent to children from Gabriel, Jake discovers that Noelle told Alex about his Christmas wish, something that he finds awkward as his ex-wife remarried. Noelle reveals that she is Santa's daughter, causing him to leave. When Nick is accosted by the actual mall Santa, Noelle intervenes and accidentally hurts a police officer, resulting in her arrest and later hospitalization for psychological evaluation.

After a visit from Polly, who reveals her identity as an elf, Jake removes Noelle from the hospital and she makes her way back to the North Pole with Nick, Polly, and the reindeer before Christmas Eve. Back home after a meeting with the elders, Nick nominates Noelle as the next Santa, which stirs up controversy throughout the town but unanimously gains agreement from the elders when they determine that there is no rule against a female Santa and they are convinced she naturally has the skills. After a few mishaps, Noelle successfully delivers the presents across the world and drops Jake off at his ex-wife's house to spend time with Alex.

Noelle is celebrated at the North Pole as Gabriel happily returns to tech support while Nick opens up a yoga studio and Polly becomes an elf elder. Noelle admits that she is proud to continue her father's legacy for being the 24th generational Santa and that Christmas will go on.

Cast 
 Anna Kendrick as Noelle Kringle, the titular character, narrator, and Kris's daughter.
 Oakley Bull as Young Noelle
 Taylor Bedford as Teenage Noelle
 Bill Hader as Nick Kringle, Kris's son, Noelle's brother and the 23rd Santa.
 Owen Vaccaro as Young Nick
 Shirley MacLaine as Elf Polly, Noelle's childhood nanny.
 Kingsley Ben-Adir as Jake Hapman, a private detective Noelle befriends.
 Billy Eichner as Gabriel Kringle, Noelle and Nick's cousin, who values cost-saving above the Christmas spirit.
 Julie Hagerty as Mrs. Kringle, Noelle and Nick's mother, and Kris's wife.
 Jay Brazeau as Kris Kringle, Noelle and Nick's father and the 22nd Santa.
 Maceo Smedley as Alex, Jake's son.
 Diana Maria Riva as Helen Rojas, the manager of the shopping center.
 Ron Funches as Elf Mortimer
 Michael Gross as Elder Elf Abe, the leader of the Elf Elders.
 Chelah Horsdal as Dr. Shelley Sussman
 Anna Van Hooft as Elf Mary
 Anthony Konechny as Elf Ted
 Burgess Jenkins as Dan
 Jason Antoon as Omar
 Shaylee Mansfield as Michelle
 Gracie Lawrence as Elf Carol

Production
On January 11, 2017, it was announced that Anna Kendrick would play the titular role of Santa Claus's daughter, Noelle, and that the movie would be written and directed by Marc Lawrence, and produced by Suzanne Todd for Walt Disney Pictures. In July 2017, Bill Hader joined the cast. In September 2017, Billy Eichner and Shirley MacLaine joined the cast. In October 2017, Julie Hagerty and Maceo Smedley joined the cast. In November 2017, Michael Gross joined the cast.

Principal photography for the film began in late-October 2017 in Vancouver, British Columbia, and later moved to Whistler Olympic Park in early-January 2018, where filming continued until January 19, 2018. The exterior for the shelter in Phoenix was St. James Anglican Church—the church's name can be seen in the Christmas Eve shot. Additional photography also took place in Woodstock, Georgia. Cody Fitzgerald and Clyde Lawrence composed the film's score.

Release
Noelle was originally scheduled to be theatrically released on November 8, 2019, by Walt Disney Studios Motion Pictures. On February 8, 2018, it was revealed that the film would be released on Disney+ instead. It was released on November 12, 2019, four days after its original theatrical release date. It was released in the United Kingdom and Latin America on November 27, 2020.

Reception

Critical response 
The site's critics consensus reads: "The always charming Anna Kendrick does her best, but Noelles progressive take on a timeless tale is unfortunately subdued." Metacritic, which uses a weighted average, assigned the film a score of 48 out of 100, based on 11 critics, indicating "mixed or average reviews".

Nick Allen of Roger Ebert.com gave the film 3 out of 4 stars, writing, "Noelle has more going for it than just being one of the easiest ways for Disney+ to make a good first impression. [...] Noelle has plenty of charm—the kind that makes a Christmas story not just simply amiable, but worth a look." Jennifer Green of Common Sense Media rated the movie a 3 out of 5 stars and wrote: "Noelle is appropriate for the whole family but will likely appeal most to grade-schoolers, who are likely to feel the most connection with its holiday-spirit messages, storylines, and humor, as well as with star Anna Kendrick. [...] The subplots of kids being deemed naughty or nice and families seeking togetherness and well-being over material possessions offer positive messages for all ages." Tim Robey of The Telegraph gave the film 3 out of 5 stars and stated: "It isn’t exactly cinema’s salvation, with a story that’s a near-shameless retread of Jon Favreau’s Elf, this time sticking Anna Kendrick in Will Ferrell’s pointy shoes. But it’s likeable stay-at-home fluff – the kind of thing you could stick on as mood music while you get the decorations out." Matt Fowler of IGN rated the film 6.7 out of 10, indicating, "Noelle is a bouncy-yet-benign Christmas caper that, despite fun performances, falls short of instant greatness." Gwen Ihnat of The A.V Club rated the movie C+ and said: "Noelle has a few of those peppermint hot chocolate moments, but thanks to its bizarre warm-weather detour and wasting of a stellar cast, it just barely makes the nice list."

Emily St. James of Vox graded the movie 2.5 out of 5, stating, "Noelle frequently feels like it’s running in place, frantically throwing shiny objects in your face in the hope you don’t lose interest. But for fans of movie depictions of Christmas, there are worse options. The production design and costumes are sprightly and colorful, and Lawrence is terrific at keeping the story moving, even when it doesn’t seem like it has any reason to keep going." Kate Erbland of IndieWire gave the film a C- rating and claimed: "Kendrick is delightful, but this Christmas comedy is a cheap holiday tchotchke with no staying power."

Accolades

See also
 List of Christmas films
 Santa Claus in film

References

External links

2019 comedy films
2010s adventure comedy films
2010s Christmas comedy films
2010s English-language films
2010s fantasy comedy films
American adventure comedy films
American Christmas comedy films
American fantasy comedy films
Disney+ original films
Films directed by Marc Lawrence
Films produced by Suzanne Todd
Films set in Phoenix, Arizona
Films shot in Georgia (U.S. state)
Films shot in Vancouver
Films with screenplays by Marc Lawrence
Santa Claus in film
Walt Disney Pictures films
2010s American films